The 1866 New Zealand general election was held between 12 February and 6 April to elect 70 MPs to the fourth term of the New Zealand Parliament.

In 1867 four Māori electorates were created, initially as a temporary measure for five years. The first Māori elections for these seats were held in 1868, with universal suffrage for Māori males over 21.

The first four Māori members of parliament were Tareha Te Moananui (Eastern Maori), Frederick Nene Russell (Northern Maori) and John Patterson (Southern Maori), who all retired in 1870; and Mete Kīngi Paetahi (Western Maori) who was defeated in 1871.

Results

a Moorhouse was elected in both the Mount Herbert and Westland electorates. He chose to represent Westland.

Notes

References